Mateo de Oviedo OFM (1547 – 10 January 1610) was the Roman Catholic Archbishop of Dublin from 1600 from his appointment on 5 May 1600 until his death. He was born in Segovia and died in Valladolid on 10 January 1610 according to some sources, or on the 2 May 1611 according to others.

References

People from Segovia
Spanish Roman Catholic archbishops
Roman Catholic archbishops of Dublin
16th-century Spanish clergy
17th-century Spanish clergy
1610 deaths
1547 births
Friars Minor
17th-century Roman Catholic archbishops in Ireland